The Delaware Nation,, based in Anadarko, Oklahoma is one of three federally recognized tribes of Delaware Indians in the United States, along with the Delaware Indians based in Bartlesville, Oklahoma and the Stockbridge–Munsee Community of Wisconsin. Two Lenape First Nations are in Ontario, Canada.

The Delaware Nation was also known as the Delaware Tribe of Western Oklahoma and was sometimes called the Absentee or Western Delaware.

Government
Delaware Nation had 2,081 enrolled members as of December 17, 2021, according to the tribal enrollment office located in Anadarko, Oklahoma.

As of March 16, 2019, Delaware Nation membership was changed from minimum blood quantum of 1/8 blood to Lineal Descendancy by vote during a Secretarial Election.

Their tribal jurisdictional area is located within Caddo County, Oklahoma. They operate their own housing authority and issue tribal vehicle tags.

The current Delaware Nation Executive Committee are:
President: Deborah Dotson
Vice-president: Michael McLane
Secretary: Ann Brower
Treasurer: Barbara Nixon
Committee Member: Terry Williams
Committee Member: Reynolds French Sr.

Economic development

The nation's annual economic impact was estimated at $5 million in 2010. Their tribal casino, Gold River Bingo and Casino, is located north of Anadarko. In August 2012, the Delaware Nation opened Casino Oklahoma located in Hinton, OK.

Language
The Delaware peoples historically spoke the Delaware language (also known as the Lenape language), Munsee and Unami, two closely related languages of the Eastern Algonquian subgroup of the Algonquian language family.

History
The Lenape people were divided into three dialectal divisions, which later became the basis for the three Clans of the Lenape. These divisions were the Monsi (Munsee) or Wolf, the Unami or Turtle, and the Unilactigo or Turkey. Today the clans are known as the Tùkwsit (Wolf Clan), Pùkuwànko (Turtle Clan), and Pële (Turkey Clan). The Delaware Nation is the Pùkuwànko (Turtle Clan).

The Delaware were the first Indian nation to enter into a treaty with the newly formed government of the United States; the treaty was signed on September 17, 1778.

The Oklahoma branches were established in 1867, with the purchase of land by Delaware from the Cherokee Nation; they made two payments totaling $438,000. A court dispute followed over whether the sale included citizenship rights for the Delaware within the Cherokee Nation. In 1867, the courts ruled that they had only purchased rights to the land for their lifetimes.

The Curtis Act of 1898 dissolved tribal governments and ordered the allotment of tribal lands to individual members of tribes. The Lenape fought the act in the courts but lost. The lands were allotted in  lots in 1907, with any land left over sold to non-Indians.

The Nation became federally recognized on July 5, 1958, as the "Delaware Tribe of Western Oklahoma." They ratified their current constitution in 1972. In November 1999, the tribe officially changed its name to the Delaware Nation.

In September 2000 the Delaware Nation of Oklahoma received 11.5 acres of land in Thornbury Township, Delaware County, Pennsylvania

In 2004 the Delaware of Oklahoma sued Pennsylvania over land lost in 1800. This was related to the colonial government's Walking Purchase of 1737, an agreement of doubtful legal veracity. The court held that the justness of the extinguishment of aboriginal title is nonjusticiable, including in the case of fraud. Because the extinguishment occurred prior to the passage of the first Indian Nonintercourse Act in 1790, that Act did not avail the Delaware.

As a result, the court granted the Commonwealth's motion to dismiss. In its conclusion the court stated: "... we find that the Delaware Nation's aboriginal rights to Tatamy's Place were extinguished in 1737 and that, later, fee title to the land was granted to Chief Tatamy—not to the tribe as a collectivity."

Notable Western Delaware
Black Beaver (1806–1880), Delaware leader, scout, and rancher
Holly Wilson (born 1968), Delaware multi-media artist

Notes

External links 

Delaware Nation – Official web site
Western Delaware, Oklahoma Historical Society's Encyclopedia of Oklahoma History and Culture.
Delaware Nation – Official Facebook page

 
Native American tribes in Oklahoma
Federally recognized tribes in the United States